Tunde Olaoluwa Adekunle (born 20 January 1986), popularly known as Tunde Ednut, is a Nigerian blogger, comedian, entertainer and musician noted for his blog and songs "Jingle Bell" and "Catching Cold", which was a Headies award nominee for best pop single at The Headies Awards of 2013. He is widely regarded as one of the most prominent bloggers in Nigeria.

In 2021, Ednut was named the Most ‘Searched Media Personality’ at the Net Honours Class of 2021. In that same year, he was listed by Ynaija as one of the most powerful young Nigerians.

Early life and education 
Originally from Kogi State, Ednut was born in Katsina to Nigerian lecturers, where he grew up as a christian before his family eventually relocated to Lagos State. He studied Graphic arts at the University of Lagos. Prior graduating from Unilag, he moved to the UK to obtain a degree in Graphic design from Kingsland University of London.

Career

2007–2008: Beginnings 
Ednut first started out as a comedian in 2007, where he was a guest performer at the Dyanmix Awards in Nigeria, and caught the attention of medias. In 2008, he was nominated for the The Future Awards Africa. Same year, Ednut began performing across Nigeria and subsequently performed in the United Kingdom where he is most noted for his comic works, Ednut was honored with The Award for the Best Nigerian Comedian in the UK before he moved back to Nigeria to pursue a career in music.

2011–present 
Ednut started his musical career in 2011 with his debut single "My Kind Song". In 2012, he released "Catching Cold" featuring Davido and Seun Kuti which was subsequently remixed in 2020 with Dr SID. In 2014, he released 3 songs which includes "Baby Boo", "Buga Won" and "Kosowo". In 2016, he would go on and release "Jingle Bell" which had multiple remixes with fellow Nigerian stars, Mi Abaga, Davido and Tiwa Savage.

Legacy 
Aside from music and blogging, Ednut helps or supports upcoming comedians and musicians by posting their videos and skits on his Instagram page. He has been credited for supporting or helping in popularizing comedians and artists such as Ugoccie, Aloma Isaac Junior, Sydney Talker and Kiriku.

Controversy 
On 22 December 2020, Ednut's verified Instagram account with over 2.6 million followers was deactivated. According to the Peoples Gazette, he violated the app's community guidelines which led to the removal of his account from the platform.

On 10 January 2021, Ednut created a new Instagram account, with the username Kingtundeednut. And as at the early hours of Wednesday 13 January, he had already garnered 1 million followers, that became a trending topic on Twitter. Same day, Ednut did a 1 million Nigerian naira giveaway to his fans in celebration of his comeback to the platform. Three days after he accomplished 1 million followers, the account was however deactivated again due to several reports from unknown persons. Same month, Instagram reinstated Ednut's account after fellow Nigerian stars rallied support asking that the account should be restored.

References 

Living people
1986 births
Nigerian musicians
Nigerian bloggers